Kleitor is a village in Achaea, Greece. It is part of the municipality Kalavryta.

For the ancient city see: Ancient Kleitor

References

Populated places in Achaea